

This list of African American Historic Places in Texas is based on a book by the National Park Service, The Preservation Press, the National Trust for Historic Preservation, and the National Conference of State Historic Preservation Officers.

Some of these sites are on the National Register of Historic Places (NR) as independent sites or as part of larger historic district. Several of the sites are National Historic Landmarks (NRL). Others have Texas historical markers (HM). The citation on historical markers is given in the reference. The location listed is the nearest community to the site. More precise locations are given in the reference.

Bastrop County
 Bastrop
 Jennie Brooks House
 Kerr Community Center
 Beverly and Lula Kerr House
 Kohler-McPhaul House
 Harriet and Charlie McNeil House
 Ploeger-Kerr-White House  (HM)

Bell County
 Texas
 Mount Zion United Methodist Church (NR)

Bexar County
 San Antonio
 Ellis Alley
Mount Zion First Baptist Church

Brazos County
 Bryan
 E.A. Kemp House (HM)

Dallas County 

 Dallas
Tenth Street Historic District (NR)
 Wheatley Place Historic District (NR)

DeWitt County
 Cuero
 E.A. Daule House, Cuero
 Macedonia Baptist Church (HM)

Ellis County
 Waxahachie
 Building at 441 East Main,
 Building at 500-502 East Main
 Joshua Chapel A.M.E. Church

Harris County
 Houston
 Antioch Missionary Baptist Church
 Freedmen's Town historic District
 Houston Negro Hospital School of Nursing Building
 Houston Negro Hospital (NR)

Houston County
 Crockett
 Mary Allen Seminary for Colored Girls, Administration Building (HM)

Hudspeth County
  Sierra Blanca
 Archeological Site No. 41 HZ 227 Possible military encampment for the 10th Cavalry  Buffalo Soldiers.
 Archeological Site No. 41 HZ 228 Possible military cemetery for the 10th Cavalry Buffalo Soldiers.
 Archeological Site No. 41 HZ 439 Possible military encampment for the 10th Cavalry

Limestone County
 Texas
 Booker T. Washington Emancipation Proclamation Park (HM)

Nacogdoches County
 Nacogdoches
 Zion Hill Historic District (NR)

Newton County, Texas 

 Shankleville
 Addie L. and A.T. Odom Homestead

Terrell County
 Dryden
 Bullis’ Camp Site Possible encampment of Lt. Bullis’ Black-Seminole Indiana scouts.(NR)

Tom Green County
 San Angelo
 Greater St. Paul AME Church (NR/HM)

Travis County
 Austin
 Clarksville Historic District
 Evans Industrial Building
 McKinney Homestead,
 Sixth Street Historic District, (NR)

Victoria County
 Victoria
 Townsend-Wilkins House
 Victoria Colored School
 Webster Chapel United Methodist Church (NR/NRL)

Williamson County
 Georgetown
 Wesley Chapel A.M.E Church (HM)

References

African-American history of Texas
Texas-related lists
History of Texas
Texas
Historic sites in Texas